Rouville was an electoral district of the Legislative Assembly of the Parliament of the Province of Canada, in Canada East, in a rural area south of Montreal.  It was created in 1841 and was based on the previous electoral district of the same name for the Legislative Assembly of Lower Canada. It was represented by one member in the Legislative Assembly. 

The electoral district was abolished in 1867, upon the creation of Canada and the province of Quebec.

Boundaries 

The electoral district of Rouville was south of Montreal (now in Le Haut-Richelieu Regional County Municipality), extending to the border with the United States.

The Union Act, 1840 merged the two provinces of Lower Canada and  Upper Canada into the Province of Canada, with a single Parliament.  The separate parliaments of Lower Canada and Upper Canada were abolished.Union Act, 1840, 3 & 4 Vict., c. 35, s. 2. 

The Union Act provided that the pre-existing electoral boundaries of Lower Canada and Upper Canada would continue to be used in the new Parliament, unless altered by the Union Act itself. The Rouville electoral district of Lower Canada was not altered by the Act, and therefore continued with the same boundaries which had been set by a statute of Lower Canada in 1829:

Members of the Legislative Assembly 

Rouville was represented by one member in the Legislative Assembly. The following were the members of the Legislative Assembly from Rouville.

Significant elections 

In the first general election for the new Parliament, the Rouville seat was won by Melchior-Alphonse de Salaberry, who narrowly defeated Timothée Franchère.  The election was marked by considerable violence, with one death. De Salaberry was a strong supporter of the government of Lord Sydenham, the Governor General. He was also one of only two Canadiens elected who supported the union.  (The other was Alexandre-Maurice Delisle, elected in Montreal County.)

However, the next year, De Salaberry accepted the lucrative position of Clerk of the Court for the district of Richelieu.  Since this position was an office of profit under the Crown, the law required that de Salaberry vacate his seat. De Salaberry stood as a candidate in the resulting by-election, but was defeated by William Walker.  Although Walker supported the British connection, he was a strong opponent of the union, and a fierce critic of Lord Sydenham's government. The by-election thus shifted the position in the Legislative Assembly somewhat.

The situation changed again in the next year, 1843.  Walker was forced to resign his seat due to ill-health (and indeed died the following year). In the resulting by-election, Franchère was elected. Since he opposed the union and supported the Groupe canadien-français, the by-election again shifted the overall standings in the Legislative Assembly.

Abolition 

The district was abolished on July 1, 1867, when the British North America Act, 1867 came into force, splitting the Province of Canada into Quebec and Ontario.  It was succeeded by electoral districts of the same name in the House of Commons of Canada and the Legislative Assembly of Quebec.

References 

Electoral districts of Canada East